Typhoon is a short novel  by Joseph Conrad, begun in 1899 and serialized in Pall Mall Magazine in January–March 1902. Its first book publication was in New York by Putnam in 1902; it was also published in Britain in Typhoon and Other Stories by Heinemann in 1903.

Plot summary
Captain MacWhirr sails the SS Nan-Shan, a British-built steamer running under the Siamese flag, into a typhoon—a mature tropical cyclone of the northwestern part of the Pacific Ocean. Other characters include the young Jukes—most probably an alter ego of Conrad from the time he had sailed under captain John McWhirr—and Solomon Rout, the chief engineer. While Macwhirr, who, according to Conrad, "never walked on this Earth"—is emotionally estranged from his family and crew, and though he refuses to consider an alternative course to skirt the typhoon, his indomitable will in the face of a superior natural force elicits grudging admiration.

Analysis
Conrad "broke new ground" by showing the ways a steam ship differs from a sailing vessel, an historic shift occurring at the time. For example how the crew were broken into "sailors and firemen" [engineers]; the unromantic labors of Hackett and Beal; the captain as a mirror of his ship, isolated from nature and lacking the power of imagination.

Stylistically, Conrad made "perhaps the most celebrated ellipsis in modern short fiction". At the end of chapter V the story reaches a climactic point, the ship barely makes it into the eye of the typhoon and faces a final challenge to exit the storm through the eye wall. 
The hurricane, with its power to madden the seas, to sink ships, to uproot trees, to overturn strong walls and dash the very birds of the air to the ground, had found this taciturn man in its path, and, doing its utmost, had managed to wring out a few words. Before the renewed wrath of winds swooped on his ship, Captain MacWhirr was moved to declare, in a tone of vexation, as it were: “I wouldn't like to lose her.”

This is followed by a single sentence:

He was spared that annoyance.

The story then leaps forward in time with the ship back in port, the events of what happened unstated. This was an innovative technique with hints of post-modernism. He challenges the reader to fill in the events of the story themselves. The break in the chronology is particularly effective, and jarring, as the preceding passages had been so detailed that the time it took to read the novel and the real time of the story were not so far apart.

Real life connections
In 1887, Conrad worked as chief mate on the Highland Forest under Captain John McWhir, whom he portrays in the novel as "McWhirr". He drew upon this 6 months voyage for the novel.

Conrad once dictated to biographer and friend Richard Curle a list of ships he served on, and the stories they were connected to—the connections might have been minor (a single character or incident) or major (a complete voyage), Conrad did not indicate. For Typhoon he said it "suggested" the steamer John P. Best which he served on.

Joseph Conrad dedicated the book to Cunninghame Graham, a fellow writer and Scots radical who was an enthusiastic supporter of Conrad since his earliest publications.

Characters
 Captain Thomas MacWhirr, an empirical man without imagination.
 Captain Wilson from "Melita", the "storm-strategist".
 Jukes, the first mate (with no first name).
 Jukes' absent friends - second mate Jack Allen and another mate from trans-Atlantic liner (addressee of Jukes' letter).
 Solomon Rout, the chief engineer, an experienced seaman.
 Second engineer Harry and third engineer Beale.
 The boatswain.
 The second mate.
 Sailors, steward and cook of the "Nan-Shan".
 The coolies, hired workers from India and China.
 The clerk for Messrs. Bun-Hin Co.
 Mrs. Lucy MacWhirr, the Captain's wife.
 Lydia MacWhirr, the Captain's daughter and Tom MacWhirr, the Captain's son.
 Mrs. Rout, the chief engineer's wife and the elder Mrs. Rout, the chief engineer's mother.
 Messrs. Sigg and Son, the owners of the boat.
 Owners and foremen (Mr. Mr. Bates and Tait) from the building yard.

References

External links

Typhoon and Other Stories, available at Internet Archive (1921 edition)
 Typhoon, available at eBooks@Adelaide

 

1902 British novels
British novellas
Novellas by Joseph Conrad
Novels first published in serial form
Novels set on ships
Works originally published in The Pall Mall Magazine